Beppe Sebaste  (born 3 June 1959 in Parma) is an Italian writer, poet, translator, and journalist.

Graduated in aesthetics at the University of Bologna with Luciano Anceschi, he received his PhD from the same university, then moved to Geneva, Paris, and Pietrasanta. He currently lives between Rome and a small town in Umbria, Italy.

Among his books, H. P. tells the inner story of Henri Paul, the driver involved in the Death of Diana, Princess of Wales; Porte senza porta (expanded as Il libro dei maestri, aka "the book of teachers" meaning in several and various disciplines) is a collection of personal meetings and some conversations which includes Bruno Hussar, Taizan Maezumi, Bruno Munari, Terry Riley, Steve Paxton, Alessandro Fersen, Daniel de Montmollin, Emmanuel Levinas, Luigi Ghirri, Elisabeth Bing, Raimon Panikkar, Mary Catherine Bateson, Frédéric de Towarnicki, and others. In 2004, he continued the meetings in a radio programme by Rai Radio 3, including Aldo Gargani, Alejandro Jodorowsky, Giulia Niccolai, etc.

He writes for newspapers such as L'Unità and la Repubblica.

Works 
Novels
Tolbiac, Baldini & Castoldi, Milan 2002 
H. P. L'ultimo autista di Lady Diana, Quiritta, Rome 2004 , new edition: Einaudi-Stilelibero, Turin 2007 ; French translation: H.P. le dernier chauffeur de Lady Diana, Éditions du Seuil, Paris 2009    (translated by Nicolas Bouvier).

Short stories
(with Giorgio Messori). L'ultimo buco nell'acqua. Racconti brevi. AElia Laelia, Reggio Emilia 1983
Café Suisse e altri luoghi di sosta. Feltrinelli, Milan 1992 
Niente di tutto questo mi appartiene. Feltrinelli, Milan 1994 
Panchine. Come uscire dal mondo senza uscirne. Laterza, Bari 2008 
La passeggiata. Manni, San Cesario di Lecce 2009  
Oggetti smarriti e altre apparizioni. Laterza, Bari 2009 
 Fallire. Storia con fantasmi, self-published, distributed by Amazon, 2015 

Essays
Lettere e filosofia. Poetica dell'epistolarità, Alinea, Florence 1998 
Porte senza porta. Incontri con maestri contemporanei. Feltrinelli, Milan 1997 
Il libro dei maestri. Porte senza porta rewind. Luca Sossella Editore, Rome 2010 

Poetry
Come un cinghiale in una macchia d'inchiostro. Nino Aragno, Torino 2018 

Edited books
 Allo stato puro della rivoluzione. Il picchio, Bologna 1980
 (with Stefania Scateni). Non siamo in vendita: voci contro il regime. Arcana, Rome 2002 

Translations
 Nicolas Bouvier. Il pesce-scorpione, Casagrande, Lugano 1991  and Marcos y Marcos, Milan 1991 , new edition: Laterza, Bari 2006 
 Jean-Jacques Rousseau. Le passeggiate del sognatore solitario. Feltrinelli, Milan 1996 , new edition: 2012 
 Emmanuel Bove. I miei amici. Feltrinelli, Milan 1991 , new edition: 2015

References

External links 
 Website and Blog
 Beppe Sebaste in the Italian newspaper "L'Unità"

1959 births
Living people
21st-century Italian novelists
Italian journalists
Italian male journalists
Italian male short story writers
Writers from Parma
Italian male novelists
21st-century Italian short story writers
21st-century Italian male writers